Philip Hawkins (7 March 1701 – 6 September 1738), of Trewithen, near Grampound, Cornwall, was a British politician who sat in the House of Commons from 1727 to 1738.

Hawkins was born at Creed, Cornwall, the fourth son of Philip Hawkins, a wealthy attorney of Pennance, Cornwall, and his wife Mary Scobell, daughter of Richard Scobell of Menagwins, Cornwall. He was admitted at Pembroke College, Cambridge on 7 March 1716, aged 15, and admitted to the Middle Temple on 2 March 1717. 

Trewithen House, near Grampound was purchased in 1715 for £2,700 by Philip Hawkins, presumably Hawkins' father as Hawkins himself was under age, but it became his residence and improvements were made to the house in 1723. Hawkins was returned unopposed as Member of Parliament for Grampound at the 1727 British general election. He was returned again unopposed at the 1734 British general election. He voted against the Administration on every recorded occasion.

Hawkins died without issue at Truro on 6 September 1738, leaving Trewithen to his nephew Thomas Hawkins. He also bequeathed '£600 to his Majesty in lieu of his tenants having defrauded the Crown of about that sum in the customs'. His brother John was Master of Pembroke College, Cambridge between 1728 and 1733.

Notes

External links

Alumni Cantabrigienses: A Biographical List of All Known Students, Graduates and Holders of Office at the University of Cambridge, from the Earliest Times to 1900, John Venn/John Archibald Venn Cambridge University Press > (10 volumes 1922 to 1953) Part II. 1209-1751 Vol. ii. Dabbs – Juxton, (1922) p336 > (10 volumes 1922 to 1953) Part II. 1752-1900 Vol. v. Pace – Spyers, (1953) p336]

.

1701 births
1738 deaths
Members of the Parliament of Great Britain for English constituencies
British MPs 1727–1734
British MPs 1734–1741
English barristers